Sören Yves Lausberg (born August 6, 1969 in Eisenhüttenstadt, Brandenburg) is a retired German track cyclist who competed in the  time trial in 1996 Summer Olympics and 2000 Summer Olympics. He finished fourth on both occasions. In 2000 was a member, with Jens Fiedler and Stefan Nimke, of the German sprint team which finished seventh in the Olympic sprint.

External links
1000m Time Trial at Full Olympians
Sprint at Full Olympians

1969 births
Living people
German male cyclists
Cyclists at the 1996 Summer Olympics
Cyclists at the 2000 Summer Olympics
Olympic cyclists of Germany
Sportspeople from Eisenhüttenstadt
People from Bezirk Frankfurt
East German male cyclists
Cyclists from Brandenburg